Fort Steuben Mall is an enclosed shopping mall located on Mall Drive in Steubenville, Ohio. Opened in 1974, it features Walmart and JCPenney as its anchor stores. There are 2 vacant anchor stores that were once Sears and Macy's.

History
The mall opened in 1974 with original anchors including Sears and Kaufmann's. The Kaufmann's store was the first in the chain to be located in a shopping mall. Goodman Company, a real estate company owned by Murray H. Goodman, built the mall. A 1975 expansion added 25 more stores and a third department store, Ashtabula, Ohio-based Carlisle's. An original tenant, Zales Jewelers, won a design competition in that chain upon opening.

In 2000, the mall was slightly renovated, while also remodeling the Sears and Kaufmann's stores. Sears closed in 2016, followed by Macy's, which acquired the Kaufmann's chain, in 2017.

The Kohan Retail Investment Group purchased Fort Steuben Mall for $10.75 million in December 2018. They would sell it in 2022 to Brookwood Capital Partners.

In early 2022, Brookwood Capital Partners acquired the shopping mall from the previous owners. Despite attracting new businesses to the mall, Brookwood Capital auctioned it off after only one month.

References

External links 

 Mall website

Shopping malls in Ohio
Shopping malls established in 1974
1974 establishments in Ohio
Tourist attractions in Jefferson County, Ohio